Club de Fútbol Motagua, formerly Club Deportivo Motagua up to 2017, is an association football club, located in Tegucigalpa, capital of Honduras.

F.C. Motagua was founded as Club Deportivo Motagua on 29 August 1928. The club competes in the Honduran top division playing its home games at the Estadio Nacional Chelato Uclés. The club is one of the most successful and renowned in Honduras.

History

The club was founded on 29 August 1928.  Three previous clubs, América, Honduras Atlética and Águila, were in the process of falling apart.  Marco Antonio Ponce and Marco Antonio Rosa called a meeting and proposed that the clubs unite to form a new club, Motagua (named for a nearby river).  After the success of the meeting, a board of directors was appointed.

The first game, played on 25 November 1928 was against Tejeros del España at La Isla. Constantine Gálvez "Tatino" was the captain and Daniel Bustillo the manager.  The team fought to a 1–1 draw.

The first international game was played on 9 April 1939 against Costa Rican side Orión at the San Felipe field in Tegucigalpa; Motagua were managed by Honduran coach Lurio Martínez and won the match 3–0 with three goals from "Gorgojo" Ramos.

Professional Era

The team debuted professionally in the 1965–66 season.  It took them only three years to win their first-ever championship.  Under the leadership of manager Rodolfo Godoy, Motagua surged past two-time defending champions Olimpia to win the 1968–69 title, with 39 points to the Olimpia's 36.  Godoy's club completed the double that season by winning the first-ever Honduran Cup.

This was the beginning of a long run at or near the top of the table for Motagua; they finished second behind Olimpia in 1969–70, then won the 1970–71 crown.  That last season ended with Motagua and Olimpia level on points, with Motagua hoisting the crown on goal difference.  They would likely have won a third championship in 1972–73, as they led the table halfway through the season.  However, the season was cancelled at its midway point, and the records expunged.

The rest of the 1970s remained a good time for Motagua.  They won titles in 1973–74 and 1978–79, while finishing second in 1974–75 and 1976–77.  The club had become established as one of the nation's strongest, and when the Honduras national football team qualified to the World Cup Finals, they featured five Motagua players.

However, the 1980s were not as strong.  Between 1979 and 1992, the club was locked out of the Honduran crown.  It wasn't until the end of the 1991–92 season that the drought was over.  They claimed that title by beating Real España 1–0 in the championship playoffs.  With the drought broken, Motagua began winning titles regularly.  They claimed the Honduran Cup in 1993 and 1995, then claimed an unexpected championship in the 1998 Apertura, beating Real España 5–2 on aggregate in the championship final.  They repeated as champions that October, beating Olimpia 1–0.

They did it again in 1999–2000, beating Olimpia on penalties in both the Apertura and Clausura finals.  They added another title in the 2002 Apertura, beating Marathón on penalties in a thrilling 5–3 shootout.  After a drought of nearly five years, Motagua returned to the top with a title in the 2006 Apertura (over Olimpia) and 2011 Clausura (again over Olimpia).

In 2013, a new golden age began.  Diego Vásquez, a veteran Honduran keeper who had played in two stints for Motagua, took over.  In just his second full season, Vasquez steered Motagua to the 2014 Apertura crown, beating Real Sociedad 2–1 in the championship final (Rubilio Castillo's header was the winner).  Three near misses followed, but in 2016–2017, Vasquez would lead the team to new heights.

It started with the 2016 Apertura.  After taking 4th in the regular season, Motagua battled their way through the quarterfinals and semi-finals (beating Olimpia).  Then they held off Platense 2–1 on aggregate to win the Apertura title. 
In the Clausura, they finished 2nd in the regular season, then stormed to the title, crushing Honduras Progreso 7–1 on aggregate.

Vasquez, who remains Motagua's manager, is the longest tenured manager in the history of Honduras's top-flight; he has managed 200 consecutive matches with Las Aguilas.

Overall, between both amateur and professional seasons, Motagua has won 27 titles.  They have won 16 professional titles.  The club has participated in all Honduran top division seasons since its inception in 1965 and is one of the few unrelegated teams.

The club

Colours and badges

Motagua's traditional colour is dark blue representing the blue waters of the Motagua River. This is because at the time the club was founded, the Motagua River was in dispute between Honduras and Guatemala. Since 2011, Motagua has worn pink jerseys for all their games during the month of October for National Breast Cancer Awareness Month.

The Motagua badge has a blue eagle. This is because one of the three clubs that united to become Motagua was named CD Águila, or Eagle in Spanish.

Stadium

Motagua plays their home matches at Estadio Nacional Chelato Uclés in Tegucigalpa. The stadium is named after Honduran football player and manager Chelato Uclés. The stadium is divided into Sol Norte, Sol Sur, Sol Centro, Preferencia, Silla and Palco. The Motaguan supporters "La Revo" are located at Sol Norte and the "Macro Azurra" sits in Sol Centro.

Traditions
There are some traditions within the Motagua institution.

Debuting players– When a new player debuts, he must shave his head. This is optional, most of the players that do shave are recently promoted from the reserve team or are young of age.

Supporters
Motagua has many supporters throughout Honduras. Motagua has one Barra Brava and three other supporters' groups. The barra brava is "Los Revolucionarios del Motagua 1928", who call themselves "La Revo". This fan group has "bandas" or smaller groups inside La Revo such as (from Tegucigalpa) "Los Fuser", "Los Dementes", "Escuadron 57", "Comando 21", "Los Poltershe", "Irreverentes", "Capone", "Infernales", "Danger's", "Anarkia", etc. (from Comayagua) "C26", (from San Pedro Sula) "Los Del Norte", (from La Ceiba) "Revo Ceiba", (from Choluteca) "Revo Choluteca", (from El Progreso) "Revo Progreso", (from Siguatepeque) "Revo Sigua". All of the "bandas" hang "mantas" or huge pieces of cloth saying their banda's name inside the stadium. They also hang one with the barra's website and many of Che Guevara. Matches from Motagua against Olimpia it's illegal to hang these mantas because some of the members go to steal them and cause great scandal so police prefer banning this. La Revo don't cause many scandals between other barras bravas in Honduras only with Olimpia's Ultra Fiel. Throughout 2006–07 La Revo had problems with Marathon's Furia Verde but they came to peace under the same belief in all of Honduras. "Por Una Honduras Libre De Chucos" which translates to "For a Honduras free of Dirtbags" (Chucos being Olimpia). Marathon, Real España and Motagua's barra bravas all have a manta with this phrase.

Another of the biggest fan group is named "Macro Azurra" which is supported by the club. They can be easily be spotted in the stadium because they generally always have blue ballons. This group is bigger in the northern territory and is sponsored by the club and by FedEx

There are also two smaller groups one being "Fortaleza Azul" and "JAH" which stands for "Justicia Amor y Humildad" which means "Justice Love and Humbleness". JAH is a religious based fan group which was founded by seven members of the Jehová es Nuestro Pastor church. JAH say that their trips are paid by God.

Sponsorship

Rivalries

Superclásico

El Clasico Capitalino (The Capital's Classic) or Superclásico Hondureño (Honduran Super Classic) is played between Motagua and Club Deportivo Olimpia.  Their matches are also known as El Clasico Local (The Local Classic) in Tegucigalpa.  There is a huge rivalry between the clubs and their fans; (La Ultra Fiel [of Olimpia] and La Revo [of Motagua]).

Clásico de las M's
El Clásico de las M's (The M's Classic) or El Derbi de las M's  (The M's Derby), is a derby football match played between Motagua from Tegucigalpa and C.D. Marathón from San Pedro Sula, two of the most successful and popular football teams in Honduras.

Motagua–Real España

The Motagua–Real España derby is not as fierce as the other two already mentioned as these both teams have a good relationship with each other from the players, to the board and the fans; however they had played seven intense league finals, four won by Real España and three by Motagua.  It is one of the most even all-time series in the league.

Short Lived
One smaller rivalry, which might be called extinct, was against Universidad (also known as UNAH). The club named Universidad, represented the Honduran National Autonomous University in Tegucigalpa, and therefore shared the city with Motagua.  This inspired a local derby until UNAH was relocated to Choluteca.  UNAH, in various occasions left Motagua out of the play-offs, intensifying the rivalry.  This derby can now be called extinct since Universidad were relegated to the Liga de Ascenso.  The club was eventually sold to, and renamed, Universidad Pedagogica Nacional-Francisco Morázan (also known as UPNFM) (National Pedagogical University-Francisco Morázan).

Achievements
Motagua is the second most successful club in Honduras having won 18 domestic leagues since the inauguration of the Honduran Liga Nacional in 1965–66.

:: → National level
Honduran Liga Nacional
Winners (18): 1968–69, 1970–71, 1973–74, 1978–79, 1991–92, 1997–98 A, 1997–98 C, 1999–2000 A, 1999–2000 C, 2001–02 A, 2006–07 A, 2010–11 C, 2014–15 A, 2016–17 A, 2016–17 C, 2018–19 A, 2018–19 C, 2021–22 C
Runners-up (14): 1969–70, 1974–75, 1976–77, 1982–83, 1990–91, 1993–94, 2002–03 C, 2007–08 A, 2009–10 C, 2014–15 C, 2015–16 A, 2017–18 A, 2017–18 C, 2020–21 C

Honduran Cup
Winners (1): 1968
Runners-up (4): 1993, 1995, 1997, 1998

Honduran Supercup
Winners (2): 1999, 2017

Honduran Amateur League
Winners (2): 1948, 1950–51
Runners-up (2): 1947, 1951–52

 → Regional level
Francisco Morazán Major League
Winners (5): 1947, 1948, 1950, 1951, 1954

 → International level
CONCACAF League
Runners-up (3): 2018, 2019, 2021

UNCAF Interclub Cup
Winners (1): 2007
Third place (1): 2002

Records

Performance by year

International performance

League records
 As of 2021–22
 Click 'show' to expand details

All time top scorers
 As of 2020–21 Apertura

All-time record vs. opponents

Domestic level

International level
 Updated 11 October 2022

 Friendly matches not included.
 Games decided by penalty shootout are counted as ties.

Current season

Squad

First-team squad

Reserve team

On loan

Retired numbers

16 –  Edy Vásquez, retired for 2 years (2007–09) in memorian of Edy Vásquez's death.

20 –  Amado Guevara, retired.

Current technical staff

Former presidents

Former managers

  Horacio Brummer (1964)
  Ernesto Henríquez (1965)
  Rodolfo Godoy (1966–67, 1969)
  Juan Colechio (1968)
  José Herrera (1969)
  Carlos Padilla (1970–74)
  Ángel Rodríguez (1976)
  Hermes Romero (1977)
  Néstor Matamala (1978)
  Rodolfo Godoy (1980)
  José Materas (1981)
  Carlos Padilla (1982, 1983–90)
  Óscar Nolasco (1985)
  Rubén Guifarro (1985–87)
  Gonzalo Zelaya (1987)
  Carlos Jurado (1990)
  Ángel Rodríguez (1991–93)
  Roberto Abruzzesse (1993)
  Ramón Maradiaga (1993–95)
  Carlos Jurado (1995–96)
  Ernesto Luzardo (1996)
  Ramón Maradiaga (1997–99)
  José Treviño (1999–00)
  Luis "Chito" Reyes (2000)
  Óscar Benítez (2000–01)
  Óscar "Cocli" Salgado (2001)
  Julio González (2001)
  Gilberto Yearwood (2001–02)
  Alejandro Domínguez (2003)
  Hernaín Arzú (2003)
  Flavio Ortega (2004)
  Edwin Pavón (2005)
  Javier Padilla (2005)
  Germán Cornejo (2005)
  Ramón Maradiaga (2006–07)
  Jorge Pineda (2008)
  Reynaldo Clavasquín (2008)
  Jaime de la Pava (2008–09)
  Juan Castillo (2009)
  Ramón Maradiaga (July 2009 – Sept 11)
  Luis "Chito" Reyes (2011)
  José Treviño (Sept 2011–12)
  Reynaldo Clavasquín (2012–13)
  Juan Castillo (2013)
  Risto Vidaković (2013)
  Milton Reyes (2013)
  Diego Vásquez (2014– February 2022)
  César "Nene" Obando (February 2022- March 2022)
  Hernán "La Tota" Medina (March 2022- Present)

Notable former players
See also :Category:F.C. Motagua players

References

External links

Official website
LaRevo1928 Official Supporters Site

 
Football clubs in Honduras
Football clubs in Tegucigalpa
Association football clubs established in 1928
1928 establishments in Honduras
Unrelegated association football clubs
M